Perserikatan Sepakbola Kabupaten Pasuruan (simply known as Persekabpas Pasuruan) is an Indonesian football club based in Pasuruan Regency, East Java. They currently compete in the Liga 3. Their home stadium is Pogar Bangil Stadium.

Honours

Liga Indonesia Second Division
Winners (1): 2003

Notable former players

Foreign
 Zah Rahan Krangar
 Alexander Robinson
 Francisco Rotunno

Local
Nehemia Solossa

References

External links
 

 
Football clubs in Indonesia
Football clubs in East Java
Association football clubs established in 1985
1985 establishments in Indonesia